D-10-YM-TV, channel 10, is a relay television station of Philippine television network People's Television Network. Its transmitter are located at Gov. Mariano F. Perdices Memorial Stadium, Capitol Compound, Dumaguete.

History
1992 - PTV begin its broadcasts in Dumaguete, which became part of People's Television Network, Inc. (PTNI).
July 16, 2001 - Under the new management appointed by President Gloria Macapagal Arroyo, PTNI adopted the name National Broadcasting Network (NBN) carrying new slogan "One People. One Nation. One Vision." for a new image in line with its new programming thrusts, they continued the new name until the Aquino administration in 2010.
2011 - After it was lasted for nineteen years in Dumaguete, the station suddenly went off the air needed to upgraded its facilities.
2015 - PTV-10 Dumaguete resumes its relay station operations, with the 5,000-watt transmitter located at Gov. Mariano F. Perdices Memorial Stadium, Capitol Compound, Dumaguete.

See also
People's Television Network
List of People's Television Network stations and channels
DWGT-TV - the network's flagship station in Manila.

Television stations in Negros Oriental
Television channels and stations established in 1992
People's Television Network stations